The John Stewart Houses are a set of five rowhouses in Center City, Philadelphia, Pennsylvania. They were all built from 1870 to 1874 using the same Italianate design by Philadelphia architect John Stewart.  They were listed on the National Register of Historic Places on November 20, 1979.

Stewart bought the lots in 1870, while he, according to the deed, took out a $61,000 loan for construction of the buildings.  Henry Phillippi, a carpenter who was apparently the contractor for the houses, received partial interest in several of them in the early 1870s.  After Stewart died the completed houses were sold in a sheriff's sale in 1874.

See also 

 National Register of Historic Places listings in Center City, Philadelphia

References

Houses completed in 1874
Italianate architecture in Pennsylvania
Houses on the National Register of Historic Places in Philadelphia
Washington Square West, Philadelphia